St. George's Higher Secondary School is a minority Christian Educational Institution run by the Catholic Bishop of the Diocese of Darjeeling.

History
The school was started in 1885 by the French Foreign Missionaries of Paris who came to Pedong in 1882. By 1911 it had become a full-fledged middle School. The C. R. Fathers of the Abbey of St. Maurice, Agaunum, Switzerland took over the management of the school in 1937. The school was raised to the status of a High School through the untiring effort of Late Rev. Fr. A. Schyrr CR. It was recognized by the West Bengal Board of Secondary Education in 1952.

About School
In 1984 – 86, Fr Rene Singh, the then Headmaster, built a big new school – building. St. George's was shifted there in the beginning of 1987. St. George's conducts classes from I to XII. Plus 2 was started at St. George's in 1988 and recognized by the West Bengal Council of Higher Secondary Education in 1989. The school has science stream in the +2 section with equipped practical laboratory. The school has facility of the computer science since 1995. The medium of instruction in all classes is English. St. George's Primary School is attached to H. S. School. St. George's is also accredited for National Institute of Open Schooling for Secondary/Sr. Secondary having capacity of 500 students. Regular classes are also arranged for the benefit of the students.

See also
Education in India
List of schools in India
Education in West Bengal

References

External links 
 Official Website

Catholic boarding schools in India
Boarding schools in West Bengal
High schools and secondary schools in West Bengal
Christian schools in West Bengal
Schools in Darjeeling district
1885 establishments in India